Grant Rice (born 14 May 1968) is an Australian former cyclist. He competed in two events at the 1992 Summer Olympics.

References

External links
 

1968 births
Living people
Australian male cyclists
Olympic cyclists of Australia
Cyclists at the 1992 Summer Olympics
Place of birth missing (living people)